Jujitsu at the 2019 Southeast Asian Games was held at the Laus Convention Centre in San Fernando, Pampanga in the Philippines, from 9 to 10 December 2019.

Participating nations

Medal table

Medalists

Men

Women

References

External links
 

2019 Southeast Asian Games events